The Marimanindji  are an indigenous Australian tribe of the Northern territory. Little is known of them.

Name
The anthropologist "Bill" Stanner thought that other attested tribal names, Maritjamiri and Mangikurungu, properly belonged to the Marinmanindji. Norman Tindale noted a similarity between their name and that of the Nanggikorongo also identified in this area, but did not draw any conclusion, since adequate material to clarify the overlap was not available.

Language
Marimanindji was a dialect within the Marrithiyel language cluster and is now virtually extinct.

Country
Marimanindji ranged to the south of Hermit Hill, in the central Daly River area. Later work indicated that they lived south of both the Daly and Darwin rivers, to the west, and near the headwaters of the Muldiva river.

People
They are generally grouped as one of the Marrithiyal

Alternative names
 Maramanandji.
 Maramarandji.
 Marimanindu.
 Marramaninjsji.
 Marramaninyshi.
 Murinmanindji.

Notes

Citations

Sources

Aboriginal peoples of the Northern Territory